Lucy Lewis Can't Lose is a children's comedy web series for ThreeNow in New Zealand. The first series became available online on 8 August 2016 and aired on Three on 25 December 2016; it was released on YouTube in March 2017. The second series was released on ThreeNow on 18 September 2017.

The series stars daughter-mother duo Thomasin McKenzie and Miranda Harcourt as the titular character and school principal. Miranda Harcourt's mother, Kate Harcourt, also makes a cameo appearance, as the school librarian.

Plot
In the first series, six mini episodes of 5–7 minutes follow Lucy Lewis (Thomasin McKenzie), a teenage Hills High student who hates public speaking, in an awkward and embarrassing journey of self-discovery. Lucy Lewis hates public speaking, but is voted class representative by well-meaning classmates who feel sorry for her because of her mild hip dysplasia, meaning she uses a crutch to walk. As class representative, she will have to give a speech at the opening of the cafeteria which will be streamed live on Newshub. She tries to get out of the role, but her teacher Mr Kinloch (Allan Henry) tells her she can't. After friend Ruby (Celia Macdonald) reveals that her family is struggling financially, and she discovers that Dave (Rāhiri Wharerau) is one of several students pretending to be Valley High Girls' students to get free breakfasts, she goes to principal Ms Parker to ask to start a free breakfast programme, but her request is declined. After snooping around Ms Parker's (Miranda Harcourt) office she discovers the principal wants to increase "voluntary" fees by thousands of dollars to get rid of children from poorer families. This leads her to change her mind about being class rep, but the principal changes the student representative to Stella (Catherine Pot), a wheelchair-using classmate who Lucy doesn't get along with. Lucy, Ruby, and Dave make a plan to gatecrash Stella's speech and broadcast the principal's evil plan live. In the library, minutes before the ceremony, Lucy practices what she will say, but is overheard by the principal, who locks her in the library. Lucy texts Ruby to rescue her, and they rush to the ceremony. As they are about to go in, they meet Stella, who is about to go onstage, and Lucy convinces her to let her go instead. She enters the cafeteria and gives a speech about how the new cafeteria will be home to free breakfasts; the principal later agrees she will go ahead with it. Dave asks her if she can go to a free breakfast with him sometime, and she agrees, before telling the audience to "shut up."

In the second series, five mini episodes of 5–7 minutes follow Lucy Lewis as an anonymous Instagrammer, later revealed to be J'ess (Erana James), using the account "Hills Highs and Lows" (a play on the school's name, Hills High), posts the "best" and "worst" outfits at the school. When Lucy's friend Ruby's outfit is posted on the account, Lucy brings up the issue with principal Ms Parker. Ms Parker then institutes a dress code. While Lucy, Ruby, Charlie (Gala Bauf), and various other girls are in a dress code detention, Lucy realises the dress code is sexist and organises a protest. When the protesters are brought to the principal's office, Lucy tells her that the dress code is sexist. Ms Parker responds by starting a uniform. To decide what the uniform will be, she launches a competition to design the uniform. Lucy enters the competition, but at the presentation, she reads from the constitution, which the librarian (Kate Harcourt) helped her find, that "uniforms are henceforth forever banned at Hill High."

Cast
Thomasin McKenzie as Lucy Lewis
Miranda Harcourt as Ms Parker, the principal
Celia Macdonald as Ruby
Catherine Pot as Stella
Rāhiri Wharerau as Dave
Allan Henry as Mr Kinloch, Lucy's English teacher
Erana James as J'ess
Gala Baumfield as Charlie
Kate Harcourt as the librarian
Rebecca Farr as Isla

Production
The series received $64,720 in government funding from NZ on Air. The show was written and produced by Amanda Alison, and directed by Paul Yates, and was filmed on location at Wellington High School. Throughout each episode, Lucy regularly breaks the fourth wall to talk to the audience or show them how she is feeling with a facial expression.

The second series began filming on 10 July 2017.

References

External links
 Lucy Lewis Can't Lose on ThreeNow
 
 Production website

Comedy web series
2016 web series debuts
2017 web series endings
Three (TV channel) original programming